Flamank is a surname. Notable people with the surname include:

George Flamank (1904–1987), American football and basketball player and coach
Gilbert Flamank ( 1508–1573), English politician
John Flamank (by 1486–1535/41), English politician
Thomas Flamank (died 1497), lawyer & leader of the Cornish Rebellion